Transporter may refer to:
 Transporter (vehicles), types of vehicles designed to transport items
 Transporter wagon, a railway car designed to carry another railway car
 Volkswagen Transporter, a model of van
 Transporter bridge, a bridge which carries cars across a river in a suspended gondola
 Middlesbrough Transporter Bridge, the transporter bridge in Middlesbrough, England

Film and television 
 The Transporter (1950 film), an Italian film directed by  Giorgio Simonelli
 Transporter (Star Trek), a fictional type of teleportation device in Star Trek
 Transporter (franchise), a series of action films starring Jason Statham
 The Transporter, a 2002 action film starring Jason Statham
 Transporter 2, a 2005 action film starring Jason Statham
 Transporter 3, a 2008 action film starring Jason Statham
 The Transporter Refueled, a 2015 action film reboot of the franchise
 Transporter: The Series, a 2012 TV series starring Chris Vance
The Transporters, a 2006 direct-to-DVD animated TV series for autistic children

Music 
 Transporter (album), a 2004 album by Immaculate Machine
"Transporter", song by Pinchers (singer)
"Transporter", song from Lil Baby's Harder Than Ever (2018)

Science and technology 
 Membrane transport protein
 Neurotransmitter transporter
 Transport protein
 Transporter-1, a spaceflight launch, that carried 143 satellites to orbit on a single rocket

Others
 The Transporters, an animated series developed by the Autism Research Centre, University of Cambridge

See also
Teleportation (disambiguation)
Transported, a 1913 Australian film